was the fifty-fourth of the sixty-nine stations of the Nakasendō connecting Edo with Kyoto in Edo period Japan. It is located in former Mino Province in what is now part of the city of Gifu, Gifu Prefecture, Japan.

History
Gōdo-juku was located on the far bank of the Nagara River from the castle town of Gifu and was the site of a ferry landing. Under the Tokugawa shogunate, no bridges were constructed across the Nagara River for defensive purposes, and all travelers, whether traveling merchants, priests, or daimyō on sankin-kōtai to-and-from the Shogun's court in Edo were required to cross by boat. 

It was located 418.7 kilometers from Edo.

Gōdo-juku was completely leveled in the Bombing of Gifu in World War II, and no structures of the former post station have survived. A small Kannon-do shrine has been reconstructed near the former ferry landing.

Gōdo-juku in The Sixty-nine Stations of the Kiso Kaidō
Utagawa Hiroshige's ukiyo-e print of Gōdo-juku dates from 1835 -1838 and is formally named  "Gifu Road Station: Godo, Nagara River Cormorant Fishing Boat" (岐阻路ノ駅　河渡　長柄川鵜飼船 Gifu no Michi no Eki: Gōdo, Nagaragawa Ukaibune). As the name implies, the scene depicted is that of Cormorant fishing on the Nagara River, which is still a popular tourist attraction in Gifu. The post station itself is not depicted.

Gōdo-juku Festival
On the last Sunday of October, the Nakasendō Gōdo-juku Committee organizes a Gōdo-juku Festival, with the support of other sponsors. The festival offers hands-on experiences and teaches about the Edo period post station.

Neighboring post towns
Nakasendō
Kanō-juku - Gōdo-juku - Mieji-juku

References

External links

Hiroshige Kiso-Kaido series
https://sites.google.com/site/onkisokaidoroad/the-69-stations/stations-51-60/kisokaido-godo-station-54?authuser=0 Godo-juku on Kiso Kaido Road]
Gifu Nakasendo Guide

Notes

Gifu
Stations of the Nakasendō
Post stations in Gifu Prefecture
Mino Province